The flagtails ( or  in the Hawaiian language) are a family (Kuhliidae) of perciform fish of the Indo-Pacific area. The family consists of several species in one genus, Kuhlia. Most are euryhaline and often found in brackish water, but the genus also includes species restricted to marine or fresh water.

Several species are known as Hawaiian flagtails, particularly K. sandvicensis and K. xenura.

Etymology
The genus Kuhlia is named for the German zoologist Heinrich Kuhl (1797–1821).

Description
The distinctive characteristic of these fish is a scaly sheath around the dorsal and anal fins.  The dorsal fin is deeply notched between the 10 spines and the 9 to 13 soft rays.  The opercle has two spines, and the anal fin three. Their bodies are compressed and silvery, and they tend to be small, growing to 50 cm at most.

During the day, they usually school, dispersing at night to feed on free-swimming  fish and crustaceans.

Species
The currently recognized species in this genus are:
 Kuhlia caudavittata (Lacépède, 1802)
 Kuhlia malo (Valenciennes, 1831)
 Kuhlia marginata (G. Cuvier, 1829) (spotted or dark-margined flagtail)
 Kuhlia mugil (J. R. Forster, 1801) (barred flagtail)
 Kuhlia munda (De Vis, 1884) (silver flagtail)
 Kuhlia nutabunda Kendall & Radcliffe, 1912 (Rapanui flagtail)
 Kuhlia petiti L. P. Schultz, 1943
 Kuhlia rupestris (Lacépède, 1802) (rock flagtail, jungle perch)
 Kuhlia salelea L. P. Schultz, 1943
 Kuhlia sandvicensis (Steindachner, 1876) (Hawaiian flagtail)
 Kuhlia sauvagii Regan, 1913
 Kuhlia xenura (D. S. Jordan & C. H. Gilbert, 1882)

Timeline

References 

 
 
Monogeneric fish families
Extant Eocene first appearances